Konstantin Rufovich Sakaev (born 13 April 1974 in Leningrad) is a Russian chess Grandmaster (1993), chess author and Russian champion in 1999. Sakaev is on the staff of the Grandmaster Chess School in St. Petersburg and has assisted Vladimir Kramnik and Nana Ioseliani in preparing for World Championship Candidates' Matches.

Notable results
 Under-16 World Champion 1990
 USSR Youth Champion 1990
 Leningrad Champion 1990
 U18 World Champion 1992
 Russian Champion 1999
 Olympic champion with the Russian team in 1998 and 2000
 16th in the 2005 FIDE World Cup.

Works

References

External links
 Konstantin Sakaev chess games at 365Chess.com
 

1974 births
Living people
Chess grandmasters
Russian chess players
World Youth Chess Champions
Chess Olympiad competitors
Russian chess writers
Sportspeople from Saint Petersburg